is a Japanese voice actress and singer. She is best known as the voice of Hagumi Hanamoto in Honey and Clover, Haruka Kaminogi in Noein: To Your Other Self, and Sayu Yagami in the anime adaptation of Death Note. Kudō also portrays Sayo Hikawa in the BanG Dream! franchise, which includes playing guitar for the band Roselia.

Career
She worked for Top Coat and was an exclusive model for Seventeen Japan from 2003 to 2006. Kudō appeared in 2007 No.15. She was originally a reader model for magazines such as CUTiE. The manager of the Top Coat era scouted her after seeing her photo in a magazine.

She debuted as a voice actress in 2005 as Hagumi Hanamoto in the TV anime Honey and Clover. She was a reader of the original manga for the same work, and was surprised when offered an audition.

After graduating from university, she moved away from performing arts activities and her contract with Top Coat expired on the end of September 2007. Thereafter she started working as a voice actress in earnest and belonged to Sigma Seven in 2011.

In August 2014, she left Sigma Seven and became a freelance.

She joined ELBS Entertainment from October 2016. Later in the year, she joined the BanG Dream! music franchise as guitarist for the band Roselia, which included portraying the fictional character Sayo Hikawa.

On May 1, 2017, she announced on her official blog that she would transfer to Ace Crew Entertainment.

On February 11, 2020, she announced her solo singer debut on Twitter. By March 25, 2020, she debut as a singer and songwriter on her mini-album, KDHR.

Filmography

Anime
Noein - To Your Other Self – Haruka Kaminogi
BanG Dream! – Sayo Hikawa
Honey and Clover – Hagumi Hanamoto
Honey and Clover II – Hagumi Hanamoto
Death Note – Sayu Yagami
Nodame Cantabile – Gorota in PuriGorota
Nodame Cantabile (live-action drama) – Gorota in PuriGorota
Hunter × Hunter (2011) – Ponzu
From the New World – Mamoru Itō (12 years old)
The World is Still Beautiful – younger Livius I
Soreike! Anpanman – Poppochan
Captain Earth – Setsuna
Cardfight!! Vanguard G: GIRS Crisis – Luna Yumizuki
Cardfight!! Vanguard G: Stride Gate – Luna Yumizuki
Bungo Stray Dogs – Yumeno Kyūsaku

Video games
BanG Dream! Girls Band Party! – Sayo Hikawa
Tales of the World: Radiant Mythology – Kanonno
Tales of the World: Radiant Mythology 3 – Pasca Kanonno
The Sky Crawlers: Innocent Aces – Maumi Orishina
Revue Starlight: Re LIVE – Yachiyo Tsuruhime

Others
Asahi Broadcasting Nagano – Ringo-maru

Discography

Albums

Mini-albums

Remix Albums

References

External links 
 Official blog 
 Official agency profile 
 Haruka Kudō at GamePlaza Haruka Voice Acting Database 
 
 Official Youtube Channel

1989 births
Living people
Japanese video game actresses
Japanese voice actresses
Sigma Seven voice actors
Voice actresses from Osaka Prefecture